Kazantzidis & Marinella – Megales Epitihies (Greek: Καζαντζίδης & Μαρινέλλα – Μεγάλες Επιτυχίες; The great hits of Kazantzidis and Marinella) is the name of a studio album by popular Greek singers Stelios Kazantzidis and Marinella. It is their first joint studio album and was released in 1964 by Odeon/Minos EMI in Greece. All songs were released on 45 rpm vinyl records in 1964–65.

Track listing 

Side One.
 "Ta moutzouromena cheria" (Τα μουτζουρωμένα χέρια; Soiled hands) – (Stelios Kazantzidis – Stefanos Vartanis)
 "Dichos filous, dichos mana" (Δίχως φίλους, δίχως μάνα; Without friends and mother) – (Kazantzidis – Kostas Psichogios)
 "Papoutsi apo ton topo sou" (Παπούτσι από τον τόπο σου; A shoe from your place) – (Theodoros Derveniotis – Kostas Virvos)
 "Osi glika echoun ta chili sou" (Όση γλύκα έχουν τα χείλη σου; The sweetness of your lips) – (Apostolos Kaldaras) 
 "Mi kles glikia manoula mou" (Μη κλαις γλυκιά μανούλα μου; Don't cry, my sweet mother) – (Stelios Kazantzidis – Ioannis Vassilopoulos) 
 "Svise to fos" (Σβήσε το φως; Turn off the light) – (Theodoros Derveniotis – Kostas Virvos) 
Side Two.
 "Ta chili sou osa ki' an poun" (Τα χείλη σου όσα κι αν πουν; Whatever your lips may say) – (Mpampis Mpakalis – Stavros Kaxos)
 "Niotho mia kourasi varia" (Νιώθω μια κούραση βαριά; I feel very tired) – (Stelios Kazantzidis – Ioannis Vassilopoulos)
 "Ap' ta cheria mou s' arpazoun" (Απ' τα χέρια μου σ' αρπάζουν; They grabbed you out of my hands) – (Mpampis Mpakalis – Panagiotis Tzochaderos)
 "Ki' an gelao ine psema" (Κι αν γελάω είναι ψέμα; If I laugh it's a lie) – (Stelios Kazantzidis – Evaggelos Atraidis)
 "To treno Germanias – Athinon" (Το τρένο Γερμανίας – Αθηνών; The Germany-Athens train) – (Stelios Kazantzidis)
 "Aponi zoi" (Άπονη ζωή; Heartless life) – (Stavros Xarchakos – Lefteris Papadopoulos)

Personnel 
 Stelios Kazantzidis – vocals
 Marinella – vocals, background vocals
 Mpampis Mpakalis – arranger and conductor on tracks 7 and 9
 Theodoros Derveniotis – arranger and conductor on tracks 3 and 6
 Stelios Kazantzidis – arranger and conductor on tracks 1, 2, 5, 8, 10 and 11
 Apostolos Kaldaras – arranger and conductor on "Osi glika echoun ta chili sou"
 Stavros Xarchakos – arranger and conductor on "Aponi zoi"
 Karapatsopoulos Photography – photographer
 Minos EMI – producer

References

1964 albums
Stelios Kazantzidis albums
Marinella albums
Greek-language albums
Odeon Records albums
Minos EMI albums